Gustavo Adolfo Bolívar Zapata (born 16 April 1985), known as Gustavo Bolívar, is a Colombian football player (defensive midfielder).

Notes

External links

1985 births
Living people
People from Apartadó
Colombian footballers
Colombian expatriate footballers
Colombia international footballers
Categoría Primera A players
Saudi Professional League players
Liga Panameña de Fútbol players
Envigado F.C. players
Deportes Tolima footballers
Al Hilal SFC players
Águilas Doradas Rionegro players
Deportivo Cali footballers
Deportivo Pasto footballers
Cúcuta Deportivo footballers
Alianza Petrolera players
2011 Copa América players
Association football midfielders
Colombian expatriate sportspeople in Saudi Arabia
Colombian expatriate sportspeople in Panama
Expatriate footballers in Saudi Arabia
Expatriate footballers in Panama
Sportspeople from Antioquia Department